In Search of Sunrise 6: Ibiza (also known as ISOS 6) is the sixth album in the In Search of Sunrise series mixed by trance DJ/producer Tiësto, released on 7 September 2007 in the Netherlands and 16 October 2007 in the United States as a double disc album. This information was confirmed on 31 July 2007 on Tiësto's website. Many file-sharing websites, earlier in 2007, released a fake torrent of In Search of Sunrise 6, labeled In Search of Sunrise 6 - London, which even included a CD cover. This was quickly noted as a fake as information of the CD had not been released via Tiësto's website nor the In Search of Sunrise series website. A special release party was held at the Heineken Music Hall in Amsterdam on 3 November 2007. Like previous In Search of Sunrise albums, this album contains a special slipcase. The album picture was taken by Stephanie Pistel. The compilation was awarded in the 2008 WMC Awards in Miami, it won for "Best Full Length DJ Mix CD".

Production
Inspiration to produce this album came from returning to Ibiza after a two-year stint in June 2007. This album was produced in 2007 during the summer time the old-fashioned way as Tiësto stated on his website. Tiësto used CD mixers and did not use any programs or computer gadgets. Tiësto also stated on his website on 13 August 2007, "Most of the tracks are so exclusive that, if I'd still be mixing with records, I wouldn't have been able to get those productions on vinyl!" On 17 August 2007 on Tiësto's MySpace blog, a thirty-second promotional video was released on YouTube.

Track listing

Note: Allure featuring Julie Thompson - "Somewhere Inside of Me" later on became known only as "Somewhere Inside" when it was released as a single.

Note: Glenn Morrison - "Contact" is actually a collaboration between Glenn Morrison and Joel Zimmerman with Joel Zimmerman credited as a co writer/producer and Glenn Morrison as the Artist.

Samplers

On 15 and 25 August two samplers exclusive to Beatport were released with four songs each. On 29 August 2007 Tiësto released a limited edition vinyl sampler that included all 8 songs from the first two samplers, which was made available online, a third sampler was released in Netherlands as a CD.

Release history

Charts

References

External links
 In Search of Sunrise 6 @ Black Hole Recordings
 In Search of Sunrise 6: Ibiza (Beatport Exclusive Sampler One)
 In Search of Sunrise 6 Promotional video
 In Search Of Sunrise 6: Ibiza review on Trance Hub

Tiësto compilation albums
2007 compilation albums